Chunliu Subdistrict is a township-level division of the Shahekou District of Dalian, Liaoning, China.

Administration
There are 12 communities within the subdistrict.

Communities:
Tai'an Community
Chunliu Community
Liujiaqiao Community
Dunhuang Community
Shalong Community
Huashun Community
Xiangsha Community
Xianghua Community
Xinxing Community
Shayuan Community
Shayue Community
Sichou Road Community

See also
List of township-level divisions of Liaoning
Shahekou

References

External links
春柳街道党建网 

Dalian
Township-level divisions of Liaoning
Subdistricts of the People's Republic of China